J. Wilton Littlechild  (born 1944), known as Willie Littlechild, is a Canadian lawyer and Cree chief who was Grand Chief of the Confederacy of Treaty Six First Nations and a member of Parliament. A residential school survivor, he is known for his work nationally and internationally on Indigenous rights. He was born in Hobbema, now named Maskwacis, Alberta.

Early life and education

Wilton Littlechild was born on 1 April 1944 in Hobbema, Alberta. He was brought to residential school at the age of six, spending 14 years in the system until his completion of high school. He witnessed and experienced abuses during that time.

As a young man, he was a successful athlete who won ten Athlete of the Year Awards. He graduated with a Bachelor of Physical Education degree in 1967, then obtained a master's degree in physical education from the University of Alberta in 1975. During his time in university, he played on the hockey and swimming teams. He later became the first status Indian from Alberta to obtain a law degree, which was earned at the University of Alberta in 1976. That year, the Cree Nations bestowed him with a headdress as an honorary chief and endowed him with his grandfather's Cree name, Mahihgan Pimoteyw, which means Walking Wolf.

Career 
Littlechild was a member of the 1977 Indigenous delegation to the United Nations and worked on the UN's Declaration on the Rights of Indigenous Peoples. He won the national Tom Longboat Award in 1967 and 1974, and was one of the founders of the North American Indigenous Games, begun in 1990 in Edmonton, Alberta. He has also consistently advocated for the creation of the World Indigenous Games, which provides competitive events for Indigenous athletes from around the world.

Littlechild was the Progressive Conservative Party of Canada Member of Parliament for Wetaskiwin from 1988 to 1993. Littlechild did not stand for re-election in the 1993 general election. After leaving Parliament, Littlechild continued to be involved in politics. He was the founder of the International Organization of Indigenous Resource Development, a United Nations non-governmental organization.

Littlechild is a member of the Ermineskin Cree Nation. The Indian Association of Alberta presents the Willie Littlechild Achievement Award to six First Nations students each year.

In 2006, Littlechild was the recipient of the Distinguished Service Award of the Canadian Association of Former Parliamentarians, awarded for "outstanding contributions to the promotion and understanding of Canada's parliamentary system of government".

In 2009, Littlechild was appointed as a commissioner to the Truth and Reconciliation Commission of Canada where he served for six years until the commission's final report and dissolution.

Littlechild received the Indspire Award for law and justice in 2015. On 30 November 2016, he became Grand Chief of the Confederacy of Treaty Six First Nations, becoming the first "non-sitting" chief to hold the position, and subsequently served for three years. In 2018, he was inducted into the Canada's Sports Hall of Fame. In 2019, Littlechild won the Pearson Peace Medal. During Pope Francis' visit to Canada in 2022, Littlechild presented the Pontiff with a traditional Indian headdress, generating mixed reactions from the Indigenous community.

See also 

 34th Canadian Parliament
 Wetaskiwin

References

Members of the House of Commons of Canada from Alberta
Progressive Conservative Party of Canada MPs
Canadian King's Counsel
Lawyers in Alberta
First Nations politicians
First Nations sportspeople
Cree people
Living people
1944 births
Members of the Alberta Order of Excellence
Indigenous Members of the House of Commons of Canada
University of Alberta Faculty of Law alumni
Indspire Awards
Members of the Order of Canada
Political office-holders of Indigenous governments in Canada
Indigenous leaders in Alberta